Sir Graham Selby Wilson FRS (10 September 1895 – 5 April 1987) was a noted bacteriologist.

Biography

He was educated at Epsom College, King's College London and Charing Cross Hospital.

He was a Lecturer in Bacteriology at the University of Manchester from 1923 to 1927 and Professor of Bacteriology as applied to Hygiene at the London School of Hygiene & Tropical Medicine from 1930 to 1947.

He was knighted in 1962, awarded the Buchanan Medal of the Royal Society in 1967, and elected a Fellow of the Royal Society in 1978.

He is buried with his wife and son on the eastern side of Highgate Cemetery.

References

1895 births
1987 deaths
Burials at Highgate Cemetery
People educated at Epsom College
Alumni of King's College London
Knights Bachelor
Fellows of the Royal Society
Academics of the University of Manchester
Academics of the London School of Hygiene & Tropical Medicine